Pectobacterium is a  bacterial genus of the family Pectobacteriaceae; it used to be a member of the genus Erwinia, which was split into three genera: Erwinia, Pectobacterium, and Brenneria.

Species include Pectobacterium carotovorum.

References

External links
 Pectobacterium page on LPSN

Bacteria genera
Enterobacterales